Knight's Pond Preserve is a nature preserve and public park located in Cumberland and North Yarmouth, Maine, United States.

Geography and usage

With a total size of 213 acres it is the largest undeveloped area in Cumberland, and is managed by the Town of Cumberland and the Chebeague and Cumberland Land Trust. Since its introduction as a managed public park in 2015, the park has seen increased use including walking, hiking, mountain biking, fishing, hunting, snowshoeing, cross country skiing, and ice skating. The preserve is also home to Blueberry Hill, which hosts an FAA ASR-11 radar tower used to monitor air traffic in the area surrounding Portland, Maine.

History

Knight's Pond was originally created by private landowners in the late 1950s who dammed Mill Brook flooding the surrounding wetland for recreational use. The pond area was privately owned but open to the public until 2015, when it was bought by the towns of Cumberland and North Yarmouth for preservation.  The forested area north of the Greely Road Extension parking area contains stone rubble from Portland's Union Station, demolished in 1961. The preserve has hosted the annual Knight's Pond Survival Challenge fundraising event since 1981. Knight's Pond was the site of several alleged UFO sightings throughout the 1960s and 1970s. In February 2023, the Blueberry Hill radar tower was used to assist in locating unidentified flying objects over the northeastern United States.

Ecology
The Preserve's combination of a large undeveloped forest, wetland, vernal pools and hilltop environments has allowed a number of rare biomes and species to exist, including flying squirrels, endangered amphibians, the northern pitcher plant, and rare oak-hickory forest typically found much further south. The pond is a habitat for migratory geese and ducks as well as a steady beaver population.

References

Protected areas of Cumberland County, Maine
Cumberland, Maine
North Yarmouth, Maine